Alcántara (Spanish), Alcàntara (Catalan), Alcântara (Portuguese), and Alcantara (Sicilian) are surnames related to the Andalusian place name Alcántara, derived from Arabic for "the bridge".

There are several related place names Alcantara, with the most noted being Alcántara, Spain, the birthplace of Saint Peter of Alcantara, the Franciscan Saint.

The surname has royal connections and the emperors of Brazil, such as Pedro II had the surname Alcântara e Silva. Consequently, the surname Alcântara is also found among freed slaves of the Brazilian household.

Spanish
Arismendy Alcántara – Dominican baseball player
Francisco Linares Alcántara – Venezuelan statesman
Izzy Alcántara – Dominican baseball player
Paulino Alcántara – Filipino footballer who made much of his career in Spain
Pedro Alcántara Herrán – Colombian statesman
Peter of Alcantara [Spanish : San Pedro de Alcántara] (1499–1562) – canonized Spanish saint
Reinier Alcántara – footballer born in Cuba who fled to the United States in 2008
Roberto Alcántara – Mexican CEO of airline Viva Aerobus
Sandy Alcántara – Dominican baseball player
Sergio Alcántara – Dominican baseball player

Portuguese
Antônio Castilho de Alcântara Machado — Brazilian journalist, politician and writer
Alcântara de Mello or Alcântara de Melo — Portuguese family with ties to Portugal's colonies between 1400 and 1974
Fabrício Lopes Alcântara — Brazilian footballer
Fernando Lopes Alcântara — Brazilian footballer
Fábio Lopes Alcântara — Brazilian footballer
Hugo Alcântara — Brazilian footballer
Iuri Alcântara (born 1980) — Brazilian mixed martial artist 
José Pedro de Alcântara — Brazilian cofounder of Conceição de Ipanema town, Minas Gerais
Monalysa Alcântara — Miss Brasil 2017
Pedro de Alcântara, Prince of Grão Para (1875–1940) — member of the Brazilian imperial family
Rafael Alcântara — Brazilian-Spanish footballer
Roberto Alcântara Ballesteros — Brazilian footballer
Thiago Alcântara — Spanish-Brazilian footballer, older brother of Rafael Alcântara
Baltasar Lopes da Silva — writer, poet and linguist from Cape Verde who sometimes used the pseudonym Osvaldo Alcântara

Filipino
Kyline Alcantara – Filipina actress and singer

References

See also
Alcantara (disambiguation)

Portuguese-language surnames
Spanish-language surnames
Catalan-language surnames